The Wilton Community School District is a rural public school district headquartered in Wilton, Iowa.

The district is split between Muscatine County and Cedar County.  The district serves the city of Wilton, and the surrounding rural areas.

List of schools
The Wilton school district operates two schools, both located in Wilton:
Wilton Elementary School
Wilton Jr-Sr High School

Wilton Jr-Sr High School

Athletics
The Beavers compete in the River Valley Conference in the following sports:

Baseball
 2-time Class 2A State Champions (1993, 2005) 
Basketball (boys and girls)
Cross Country (boys and girls)
Football
Softball
Track and Field (boys and girls)
Volleyball
Wrestling
 2-time Class 1A State Champions (1997, 2002)

See also
List of school districts in Iowa
List of high schools in Iowa

References

External links
 Wilton Community School District

School districts in Iowa
Education in Cedar County, Iowa
Education in Muscatine County, Iowa